Reuben Leon Kahn (July 26, 1887 in Kovno, Russian Empire – July 22, 1979 in Miami) was an American immunologist.

He is best known for his investigations of blood reactions, like the Kahn test, an efficient test for syphilis.

References

External links
Kahn test
Today in Science History

American immunologists
Emigrants from the Russian Empire to the United States
Lithuanian Jews
Physicians from Kaunas
1887 births
1979 deaths
New York University alumni
Yale University alumni
Valparaiso University alumni